Ayman Moheb (Arabic أيمن محب; born March 11, 1970) is an Egyptian former football striker. He was the top scorer of Egyptian Premier League (1996–97) with 17 goals playing for El Mansoura.

International career

After being the top goal scorer, Moheb made some appearances for the Egypt national football team, including 1998 FIFA World Cup qualifying matches. He also played for Egypt at the 1997 Korea Cup in South Korea.

Titles and honours
 Top scorer in Egyptian Premier League (1996–97) with 17 goals.

References

External links
 
 
 

1970 births
Living people
Egyptian footballers
Egypt international footballers
Association football forwards
El Mansoura SC players
Ala'ab Damanhour SC players
People from Mansoura, Egypt